Don Shaw is a British screenwriter and playwright. His credits include Survivors, Doomwatch, Orde Wingate, and Bomber Harris. Shaw stated that before he took on writing for Survivors, 'I was very much an up-and-coming hot-shot writer. I was being sought after by The Wednesday Play and Play for Today and things like that.'

Awards
In 1990 Shaw was nominated for a Bafta for his work on the TV film Bomber Harris.

References

External links

British male screenwriters
Living people
English television writers
English science fiction writers
British science fiction writers
1934 births
British male television writers